Cham Khusheh (also Romanized as Cham Khūsheh) is a village in Kashkan Rural District, Shahivand District, Dowreh County, Lorestan Province, Iran. At the 2006 census, its population was 687, in 146 families.

References 

Towns and villages in Dowreh County